Straight Lake State Park is a  Wisconsin state park north of the village of Luck, Wisconsin. Straight Lake State Park was established in 2002. The park is traversed by the Ice Age National Scenic Trail, which runs along the northern shore of Straight Lake before following the course of the Straight River through the Straight River Tunnel Channel.  The Clam Falls Trail, an abandoned road that served as an important thoroughfare during the logging era, also traverses the park roughly parallel to the Ice Age Trail.

References

External links
Straight Lake State Park website

Protected areas of Polk County, Wisconsin
State parks of Wisconsin
Protected areas established in 2002
2002 establishments in Wisconsin
Lakes of Polk County, Wisconsin
Lakes of Wisconsin